The 1971 ASA/DGWS Women's College World Series (WCWS), the third in its history, was held in Omaha, Nebraska. On May 14–16, softball teams from 28 colleges met in that year's national fastpitch softball tournament, still the largest number of teams to play in a single-site WCWS. The tournament consisted of 55 games.

Teams
The double-elimination tournament included these teams:

 Arizona State
 Buena Vista College (Iowa)
 Central Missouri State College
 Concordia Teachers College (Nebraska)
 Eastern Illinois
 Illinois State
 Iowa State
 John F. Kennedy College (Nebraska)
 Kansas State Teachers College (now Emporia State)
 Kearney State College (Nebraska)
 Luther College (Iowa)
 Midland Lutheran College (Nebraska)
 Minnesota–Duluth
 Minot State College (North Dakota)
 Nebraska
 Nebraska–Omaha
 Northern Colorado
 Parsons College (Iowa)
 Simpson College (Iowa)
 South Dakota
 South Dakota State
 Southern Illinois
 Southwest Baptist College (Missouri)
 Southwest Missouri State College
 Upper Iowa
 Wartburg College (Iowa)
 Wayne State College (Nebraska)
 Wisconsin State–Eau Claire

The John F. Kennedy College Patriettes won their third consecutive national championship, this time from the loser's bracket, by shutting out the Iowa State Cyclonettes twice in the final, 6–0 and 4–0. Paula Miller of Arizona State was named the tournament's Most Valuable Player, pitching all of ASU's seven games.  Iowa State's result occurred despite having zero funding from the university.

Bracket
The individual game results are shown in the tournament bracket below.

Ranking

See also

References

Women's College World Series
Soft
Women's College World Series
Women's College World Series
Women's College World Series
Women's sports in Nebraska